For Endless Trees, or For Endless Trees IV, is a public sculpture by American artist Gary Freeman. It is located in front of the WFYI office building in Indianapolis, Indiana, United States. The Cor-Ten steel sculpture consists of four vertical beams, grouped closely together, that branch out at the top. It measures approximately sixteen feet tall, five feet wide and four feet long. The sculpture was commissioned by the Indiana Gas Company in 1991 for their offices at 1600 North Meridian Street. This location is now home to WFYI.

See also
 Monumentalment IV
 Broken Walrus I
 Broken Walrus II

References

External links
 Photo of For Endless Trees in Flickr

Outdoor sculptures in Indianapolis
Steel sculptures in Indiana
Culture of Indianapolis
1991 sculptures